Anna Lisa Christiane is a New Zealand beauty pageant titleholder who was crowned as Miss Earth New Zealand 2015 and New Zealand's representative in Miss Earth 2015.

Miss Earth New Zealand 2015

Christiane was able to win the main title of the pageant. She also won the "Best in Cocktail Dress" award. The pageant was held at Imperial Palace, Auckland on 25 July 2015.

Miss Earth 2015

Being the winner of Miss Earth New Zealand 2015, Christiane became New Zealand's representative at the Miss Earth 2015

External links
Anna-Lisa Christiane at Miss Earth official website

References

Miss Earth 2015 contestants
New Zealand beauty pageant winners
Living people
New Zealand female models
1994 births